Janiosteus is an extinct monospecific genus of placoderm arthrodire from the Middle Devonian: Late Givetian stage found in Timan, Russia.

Phylogeny
Janiosteus is a member of Panxiosteidae. In the 2010 Carr & Hlavin phylogenetic study, Panxiosteidae was recognized as the sister taxon to the family Dunkleosteidae, which together comprised the superfamily Dunkleosteoidea (one of the three major clades of Eubrachythoraci). 
The phylogeny of Janiosteus within Panxiosteidae is shown in the cladogram below from the 2013 Zhu & Zhu study:

However, the subsequent 2016 Zhu et al. study using a larger morphological dataset recovered Panxiosteidae well outside of Dunkleosteoidea, instead within Coccosteomorphi and then Coccosteoidea as the sister group of Coccosteidae, as shown in the cladogram below:

References

Arthrodire genera